The Malayo-Sumbawan languages are a proposed subgroup of the Austronesian languages that unites the Malayic and Chamic languages with the languages of Java and the western Lesser Sunda Islands (western Indonesia), except for Javanese (Adelaar 2005). If valid, it would be the largest demonstrated family of Malayo-Polynesian outside Oceanic. The Malayo-Sumbawan subgroup is however not universally accepted, and is rejected e.g. by Blust (2010) and Smith (2017), who supported the Greater North Borneo and Western Indonesian hypotheses. In a 2019 paper published in Oceanic Linguistics, Adelaar accepted both of these groupings, in addition to Smith's (2018) redefinition of Barito languages as forming a linkage.

Classification
According to Adelaar (2005), the composition of the family is as follows:

Malayo-Sumbawan
Sundanese (1 or 2 languages of western Java; incl. Baduy)
Madurese (2 languages of eastern Java and Madura Island, including Kangean)
Malayo-Chamic–BSS
Chamic (a dozen languages, including Acehnese in Aceh of Indonesia, and Cham in South Vietnam, Cambodia and Hainan island of China)
Malayic (a dozen languages dispersed from either western Borneo or central Sumatra, including Malay/Indonesian, Minangkabau in central Sumatra,  and Iban of western Borneo)
Bali–Sasak–Sumbawa (3 languages)

Javanese is specifically excluded; the connections between Javanese and Bali–Sasak are mainly restricted to the 'high' register, and disappear when the 'low' register is taken as representative of the languages. This is similar to the case of English, where more 'refined' vocabulary suggests a connection with French, but basic language demonstrates its closer relationship to Germanic languages such as German and Dutch. Moken is also excluded.

Sundanese appears to share sound changes specifically with Lampung, but Lampung does not fit into Adelaar's Malayo-Sumbawan.

References

Gil, David (2012). "The Mekong-Mamberamo Linguistic Area".

External links
NUSA – Linguistic Studies of Indonesian and Other Languages in Indonesia

Agglutinative languages
Malayo-Polynesian languages